Sir  Yue-Kong Pao CBE JP (10 November 1918 — 23 September 1991), is the founder of Hong Kong's Worldwide Shipping Group which in the 20 years from purchasing its first used ship in 1955 became by far the largest shipping company in the world with over . Anticipating the seriousness of the shipping downturn starting in the late 1970s, he drastically reduced his fleet and was able to pay off associated debt and raise cash to diversify his interests notably through the purchase of a controlling stake in The Hongkong and Kowloon Wharf and Godown Company Limited (now known as Wharf (Holdings)) and later Wheelock Marden giving exposure to Hong Kong real estate, shipping terminals, retail, ferries, and trams. He was noted for his unmatched access to leaders in both the commercial and political arenas and was equally at ease with Western political leaders and the Chinese leadership in the run-up to Hong Kong's ceasing to be a British colony in 1997 (for example Margaret Thatcher wrote the foreword to his biography published in 1990 and he was appointed a Vice-Chairman of the Hong Kong Basic Law Drafting Committee planning Hong Kong's constitution after 1997). He was also a generous philanthropist notably in educational projects (helping set up universities, libraries, and scholarship schemes). He died in 1991 but his corporate legacy continues to be controlled and run by his family.

Early life
Pao was born in 1918 in Ningbo, the third of seven children of an upper-middle-class family. He was a 29th-generation descendant of Bao Zheng. In 1931, he went to Hankou to work in his father's shoe manufacturing business whilst continuing his education at night. However, he decided that the shoe business did not suit him and he secured a traineeship with a foreign insurance company. By the age of twenty, he was established in his new position and married his wife Huang Sue-Ing, who was chosen by his parents.

In 1937, Hankou came under attack from the Japanese, and Pao along with 70 colleagues moved to Hunan and then Shanghai whilst leaving his wife in the relative safety of Ningbo. As tension eased, he sent for his wife to join him.

Career 
In the late 1930s in Shanghai, Pao found a position in the insurance department of the Central Trust of China. Pao was soon moving up the corporate ladder, moving into the area of banking, and moving to Hengyang and Chongqing as the progress of the war dictated.

In 1945, at the end of the war, he was sent by the Government back to Shanghai to help set up and manage the new Municipal Bank and in a short time had worked his way to Deputy general manager, effectively in charge.

Move to Hong Kong
With the approaching fall of the "Bamboo Curtain", Pao and all his family had moved to Hong Kong by the spring of 1949, having managed to remit much of the family's assets and money before events made it impossible. It was impossible to resume a banking career and, given the prevailing uncertainties, he did not wish to commit to investing in machinery and land in Hong Kong, so Pao started an Import/Export business dealing in Chinese goods. Following the UN trade embargo resulting from China's entry into the Korean War, the company broadened its scope to Europe, although trade with China continued in a circuitous way through skilful exploitation of legal loopholes in the embargo. It was during the first half of the 1950s that Pao first made contact with Jake Saunders (who was running the Imports Department) and Guy Sayer (also working in the department) at the Hongkong and Shanghai Banking Corporation. Both were later to become Chief Manager and Chairman of the bank, and the relationship was to be a decisive element in the growth of Pao's businesses.

Founding of World-Wide Shipping
As his business grew, Pao looked around for suitable new ventures and in 1955 decided to branch into shipping (still focusing on assets that were not fixed in Hong Kong) and embarked on an intensive learning process. Shipowning in Hong Kong had a poor reputation at that time with the banks and so the first vessel, a 28-year-old coal burning 8,200 tonne freighter, was purchased without finance. Having seen this and the rigorousness employed by Pao in the purchase process, the Hongkong Bank extended a loan for the second purchase, the start of long and fruitful relationship which led to Pao being appointed to the board of the bank in 1971 and later to become its vice-chairman.

The shipping business grew rapidly driven by the post war economic miracle taking place in Japan and the resulting need for freight and oil carrying capacity. Pao devised a system whereby he was able to secure bank guaranteed three-year charters prior to purchasing ships thus significantly reducing the business risks and creating a very attractive lending opportunity for the banks financing the ship purchase. This basic scheme (known in Japan as a "shikumisen" arrangement) was extended when World-Wide moved into commissioning construction of new ships in 1961.

Indeed, the fleet was larger than the combined fleets of the famous Onassis, Niarchos and Lemos families. In recognition of his achievements Pao was made an Honorary Doctor of Law by the Hong Kong University in 1975, and in 1976 appeared on the front cover of Newsweek magazine with the heading "King of the Sea". Pao received the Golden Plate Award of the American Academy of Achievement in 1977. He was knighted in 1978.

Diversification
1978 saw the start of a severe downturn in the shipping business. Pao and his managers were quick to spot the problem and commenced a programme to reduce the fleet, especially crude oil carriers, selling ships as they came off charter. 140 ships were sold and the fleet reduced by half over a period of 4 to 5 years allowing debt to be paid off and cash resources built up. Although this was a difficult time for World-Wide, the company, through early action and conservative financial management, was able to ride the recession with little of the problems seen elsewhere in the industry.

In the mid 1970s Pao had bought from Ka-shing Li (Li Ka-shing) a 10% holding in the Hong Kong and Kowloon Wharf and Godown Co. Ltd. (now The Wharf (Holdings)) and by 1977 had built this to 30%. Wharf had historically been in the Jardine Matheson sphere of influence. Friction with the Jardine camp broke out in the late 1970s over board appointments which concluded with the Pao camp being allowed two more directorships (making 4 out of a total 12). Hostilities broke out again in June 1980 with Jardines launching a cash and shares bid for Wharf. Although in Europe at the time, Pao and his team were able rapidly to put together a successful cash tender for shares to take his holding to 49% and securing control of Wharf. Pao then took over the roles of chairman and Chief Executive. Wharf gave World-Wide exposure to prime Kowloon waterfront property as well as ownership of Hong Kong Tramway and the Star Ferry.

In 1985, Pao was able to take control of Wheelock Marden, one of Hong Kong's premier companies established in 1857, when John Cheung sold his 34% stake to Pao for HK$2.5 billion forming a core shareholding from which to launch a bid in opposition to the bid from Tan Sri Khoo Teck Puat who had bought John Marden's 34% stake in the company. Wheelock gave World-Wide exposure to more prime central Hong Kong property as well as the Lane Crawford department store.

Retirement and other activities 
In 1986, Pao retired from day-to-day management of the group handing over the shipping business to his son-in-law Helmut Sohmen and the Wheelock / Wharf interests to Peter Woo, another son-in-law. By 1989 he announced that he had given up his interests in the Trusts that held the Pao family assets (the shipping interests going to the Sohmen family and the Wheelock / Wharf interests going to the Woo family) and gave up his title as Honorary Chairman of World International. He had already retired from his directorship of the Hongkong and Shanghai Banking Corporation in 1983 when he hit the mandatory retirement age of 65 but continued to lead a very active life taking in advisory roles (formal and informal) and philanthropic activities. Over the years, Pao was on a number of corporate advisory committees including Chase Manhattan Bank, Industrial Bank of Japan, AT&T, United Technologies Corporation and Caterpillar Inc.

Pao was active in philanthropic works and was particularly interested in educational projects. Among notable gifts were US$20m to found Ningbo University, a £14m contribution to the Sino-British Friendship Scholarship scheme to enable Chinese students to attend British Universities and a US$10m gift to build a library at Shanghai Jiao Tong University.

Personal 
Pao had 4 daughters. On 23 September 1991, Pao died in Hong Kong at age 72. His son-in-law Peter Woo became the patriarch of Pao's business empire.

Legacy
The YK Pao School in Shanghai was founded in memory of Sir Yue-Kong Pao. Yue-Kong Pao Hall at Purdue University and the Pao Yue-Kong library at the Hong Kong Polytechnic University were also named in his honour. There is also a Sir Yue-Kong Pao Hall in Chinese International School as well as Pao Yue Kong Swimming Pool in Wong Chuk Hang in Hong Kong.

Sources

References

External links 
 Pao family profile at Forbes.com

1918 births
1991 deaths
Hong Kong chief executives
Hong Kong shipping businesspeople
Hong Kong billionaires
BW Group
Hong Kong philanthropists
Businesspeople from Ningbo
Billionaires from Zhejiang
The Wharf (Holdings)
Knights Bachelor
Hong Kong Basic Law Drafting Committee members
20th-century philanthropists
Chinese company founders
Chinese emigrants to Hong Kong